The Gardebataillon ("Guard Battalion") is a ceremonial unit in the Austrian Armed Forces. The Gardebataillon is one of the most important military units in the Austrian Armed Forces as its main task is to represent Austria at home and abroad. It is stationed exclusively at Maria Theresien Barracks in Vienna.

History 

The battalion was formed on March 1, 1935, as the Vienna Guard Battalion. At that time it was based at the Hofburg Imperial Palace. It was dissolved in 1938 following the German Anschluss.

In 1956, the unit was restored, initially under the name Heereswachbataillon ("Army guard battalion"). Since that time it has had its headquarters in the Maria Theresa barracks. On 15 May 1957, it reassumed its original name.

Regimental Structure 

 HQ Staff Corps
 Guard Companies
 Active Duty Companies
 1st Active Duty Company
 2nd Active Duty Company
 Honor Guard Companies
 1st Honor Guard Company
 2nd Honor Guard Company
 Gardemusik

Uniform 

Their uniform is very similar to the uniform of the German Wachbataillon. The soldiers of the Guard are distinguished by their red beret, and their white collar.  Apart from the beret, the battalion's uniform also includes a ceremonial helmet, with the Coat of arms of Austria on the front.

Purpose 
Its tasks include the protection of federal buildings such as the Hofburg Imperial Palace and the Federal Chancellery. The battalion also provides Guards of Honour to carry out representative duties (such as accreditations of ambassadors, welcoming ceremonies, and parades). Of these, the seniormost task is to provide honours for high ranking high ranking national & foreign dignitaries during events of importance. The deliverable for this task is the battalion's two honor Guard companies. The detached companies perform their respective public duties in Vienna, the national capital. It also appears during repatriation ceremonies for fallen soldiers returning from combat.

Gardemusik Wien 

The Gardemusik Wien (Guards Band Vienna) is one of the nine military bands in Austria and is the official regimental band of the Gardebataillon. It was formed after the Austrian State Treaty came into effect, the band was formed from the band of the Austria border guard department. It consists of 60 military musicians. It regularly provides musical accompaniment to the rest of the battalion. The unit always composes a new military march during a presidential inauguration in honor of the elected President of Austria (e.g. Alexander Van der Bellen in 2017.).

Photos

Gardebataillon

Gardemusik

See also
 Austrian Armed Forces
 Wachbataillon
 Foot guards
 Guard of honour

References

External links

 Website of the Bundesheer - Gardebataillon
 Website of the Bundesheer - Gardemusik
 Official Youtube Channel
 The Gardebataillon on their 60th anniversary

Military units and formations of Austria
Military units and formations established in 1935
Guards of honour